Benson is a town in Johnston County, North Carolina, United States, near the intersection of Interstates 95 and 40. Benson celebrates Mule Days on the fourth Saturday of September, a festival that attracts over 60,000 people each year. In 2010, the population was 3,311, up from 2,923 in 2000.

History

The town of Benson, which derives its name from early settler Alfred Monroe ("Mim") Benson, owes much of its historical development to the railroad line which passed through the present location in town in 1886 on its route between Fayetteville and Contentnea. More information on the history of Benson and the surrounding communities may be found at the new Benson Museum of Local History located at 102 W. Main Street, next to the Mary Duncan Library.

Mr. Benson's purchase of a  tract along the Smithfield-Fayetteville Road in 1874 initiated the settlement of the area now known as Benson. During the 1880s Benson sold portions of his original tract to incoming settlers, many of whom were farmers. Benson was incorporated in 1887 and soon attracted a number of entrepreneurs wishing to take advantage of this new town along an important transportation route.

A prominent early resident of the Benson area was John William Wood Sr. (December 28, 1855 - October 31, 1928) who rode to Benson each morning on a mule and wagon from his home at Peacocks Crossroads near Meadow. After having served on the Board of Education and as a county commissioner, where he was known to be a watchdog of the treasury, he was elected to a term in the State House of Representatives in 1927. Meadow School was built on land donated by him.

The Benson Historic District and Hannah's Creek Primitive Baptist Church are listed on the National Register of Historic Places.

Benson is home to Alpha Company 230th BSB, who were deployed in 2009 in support of Operation Iraqi Freedom.

Geography
U.S. Route 301 (Wall Street) passes through the center of the town, leading northeast  to Smithfield, the Johnston county seat, and southwest  to Dunn. North Carolina Highway 50 is Benson's Main Street, crossing US 301 in the center of town and leading north  to Garner and southeast  to Newton Grove. Interstate 95 passes through the southeastern side of Benson and runs parallel to US 301, connecting Fayetteville and Rocky Mount, while Interstate 40 passes northeast of the town and runs parallel to NC 50, leading to Raleigh and Wilmington.

Demographics

2020 census

As of the 2020 United States census, there were 3,967 people, 1,309 households, and 943 families residing in the town.

2010 census
As of the census of 2010, there were 3,311 people, 1,301 households, and 787 families residing in the town. The population density was 1,402 people per square mile (860/km2). There were 1,554 housing units at an average density of 650 per square mile (403.6/km2). The racial makeup of the town was 57.61% White, 34.04% African American, 0.48% Native American, 0.44% Asian, 0.07% Pacific Islander, 5.78% from other races, and 1.57% from two or more races. 7.29% of the population were Hispanic or Latino of any race.

There were 1,230 households, out of which 29.7% had children under the age of 18 living with them, 37.0% were married couples living together, 20.6% had a female householder with no husband present, and 38.4% were non-families. 34.2% of all households were made up of individuals, and 17.1% had someone living alone who was 65 years of age or older. The average household size was 2.38 and the average family size was 3.05.

In the town, the population was spread out, with 27.5% under the age of 18, 9.5% from 18 to 24, 27.6% from 25 to 44, 20.1% from 45 to 64, and 15.2% who were 65 years of age or older. The median age was 34 years. For every 100 females, there were 83.0 males. For every 100 females age 18 and over, there were 74.0 males.

The median income for a household in the town was $26,582, and the median income for a family was $32,277. Males had a median income of $29,375 versus $20,045 for females. The per capita income for the town was $14,350. 25.0% of the population and 20.2% of families were below the poverty line. 39.7% of those under the age of 18 and 23.2% of those 65 and older were living below the poverty line.

Education
Schools located in Benson include Benson Elementary School, Meadow Elementary School, Benson Middle School, and South Johnston High School.

Notable people
 Drew Herring, NASCAR Cup Series driver
 Hunter Johnson, composer and musician; composed music for some of Martha Graham's ballets
 John Medlin, finance executive. CEO of Wachovia from 1977–1993
 Earl Stephenson, Major League Baseball pitcher during the 1970s
 Shelby Stephenson, poet and musician; installed as Poet Laureate of North Carolina in February 2015
 Ray Tanner, athletic director for the University of South Carolina; head coach of South Carolina Gamecocks baseball team from 1995 to 2012; won consecutive national championships in 2010 and 2011
 Robert D. Warren Sr., educator and North Carolina state senator
 John William Wood Sr., one of the founders of Benson, North Carolina

References

External links
 Town of Benson official website

Towns in North Carolina
Towns in Johnston County, North Carolina
Populated places established in 1874
1874 establishments in North Carolina